Alvaradoa is a genus of plants in the family Picramniaceae.

It contains the following species of shrubs or small trees:
 Alvaradoa amorphoides Liebm.
 Alvaradoa arborescens Griseb.
 Alvaradoa haitiensis Urb.
 Alvaradoa jamaicensis Benth.
 Alvaradoa lewisii R.A.Howard & Proctor
 Alvaradoa subovata Cronquist

References

Picramniales
Taxonomy articles created by Polbot